Cauliflower is one of several vegetables in the species Brassica oleracea in the genus Brassica, which is in the Brassicaceae (or mustard) family. It is an annual plant that reproduces by seed. Typically, only the head is eaten – the edible white flesh is sometimes called "curd" (with a similar appearance to cheese curd). The cauliflower head is composed of a white inflorescence meristem. Cauliflower heads resemble those in broccoli, which differs in having flower buds as the edible portion. Brassica oleracea also includes broccoli, Brussels sprouts, cabbage, collard greens, and kale, collectively called "cole" crops, though they are of different cultivar groups.

History 
Pliny the Elder  included cyma among cultivated plants he described in Natural History: "Ex omnibus brassicae generibus suavissima est cyma" ("Of all the varieties of cabbage the most pleasant-tasted is cyma"). Pliny's description likely refers to the flowering heads of an earlier cultivated variety of Brassica oleracea.

In the Middle Ages, early forms of cauliflower were associated with the island of Cyprus, with the 12th- and 13th-century Arab botanists Ibn al-'Awwam and Ibn al-Baitar claiming its origin to be Cyprus. This association continued into Western Europe, where cauliflowers were sometimes known as Cyprus colewort, and there was extensive trade in western Europe in cauliflower seeds from Cyprus, under the French Lusignan rulers of the island, until well into the 16th century.

François Pierre La Varenne employed chouxfleurs in Le cuisinier françois. They were introduced to France from Genoa in the 16th century and are featured in Olivier de Serres' Théâtre de l'agriculture (1600), as cauli-fiori "as the Italians call it, which are still rather rare in France; they hold an honorable place in the garden because of their delicacy",  but they did not commonly appear on grand tables until the time of Louis XIV. It was introduced to India in 1822 by the British.

Etymology 
The word "cauliflower" derives from the Italian cavolfiore, meaning "cabbage flower". The ultimate origin of the name is from the Latin words caulis (cabbage) and flōs (flower).

Horticulture

Cauliflower is relatively difficult to grow compared to cabbage, with common problems such as an underdeveloped head and poor curd quality.

Climate

Because the weather is a limiting factor for producing cauliflower, the plant grows best in moderate daytime temperatures , with plentiful sun and moist soil conditions high in organic matter and sandy soils. The earliest maturity possible for cauliflower is 7 to 12 weeks from transplanting. In the northern hemisphere, fall season plantings in July may enable harvesting before autumn frost.

Long periods of sun exposure in hot summer weather may cause cauliflower heads to discolor with a red-purple hue.

Seeding and transplanting

Transplantable cauliflowers can be produced in containers such as flats, hotbeds, or fields. In soil that is loose, well-drained, and fertile, field seedlings are shallow-planted  and thinned by ample space – about 12 plants per . Ideal growing temperatures are about  when seedlings are 25 to 35 days old. Applications of fertilizer to developing seedlings begin when leaves appear, usually with a starter solution weekly.

Transplanting to the field normally begins in late spring and may continue until mid-summer.
Rapid vegetative growth after transplanting may benefit from such procedures as avoiding spring frosts, using starter solutions high in phosphorus, irrigating weekly, and applying fertilizer.

Disorders, pests, and diseases

The most important disorders affecting cauliflower quality are a hollow stem, stunted head growth or buttoning, ricing, browning, and leaf-tip burn. Among major pests affecting cauliflower are aphids, root maggots, cutworms, moths, and flea beetles. The plant is susceptible to black rot, black leg, club root, black leaf spot, and downy mildew.

Harvesting

Forced air cooling to remove heat from the field during hot weather may be needed for optimal preservation. Short-term storage is possible using cool, high-humidity storage conditions.

Pollination 
Many species of blowflies, including Calliphora vomitoria, are known pollinators of cauliflower.

Classification and identification 
There are four major groups of cauliflower.

 Italian: This specimen is diverse in appearance, biennial, and annual in type. This group includes white, Romanesco, and various brown, green, purple, and yellow cultivars. This type is the ancestral form from which the others were derived.
 Northern European annuals: Used in Europe and North America for summer and fall harvest, it was developed in Germany in the 18th century and includes the old cultivars Erfurt and Snowball.
 Northwest European biennial: Used in Europe for winter and early spring harvest, developed in France in the 19th century and includes the old cultivars Angers and Roscoff.
 Asian: A tropical cauliflower used in China and India, it was developed in India during the 19th century from the now-abandoned Cornish type and includes old varieties Early Benaras and Early Patna.

Varieties 
There are hundreds of historic and current commercial varieties used around the world. A comprehensive list of about 80 North American varieties is maintained at North Carolina State University.

Colours 
 White White cauliflower is the most common color of cauliflower, having a contrasting white head (also called "curd") surrounded by green leaves.
 Orange Orange cauliflower contains beta-carotene as the orange pigment, a provitamin A compound. This orange trait originated from a natural mutant found in a cauliflower field in Canada. Cultivars include 'Cheddar' and 'Orange Bouquet.'
 Green Green cauliflower in the B. oleracea Botrytis Group is sometimes called broccoflower. It is available in the normal curd (head) shape and with a fractal spiral curd called Romanesco broccoli. Both have been commercially available in the U.S. and Europe since the early 1990s. Green-headed varieties include 'Alverda,' 'Green Goddess,' and 'Vorda.' Romanesco varieties include 'Minaret' and 'Veronica.'
 Purple The purple color in this cauliflower is caused by the presence of anthocyanins, water-soluble pigments that are found in many other plants and plant-based products, such as red cabbage and red wine. Varieties include 'Graffiti' and 'Purple Cape.'
In Great Britain and southern Italy, a broccoli with tiny flower buds is sold as a vegetable under the name "purple cauliflower"; it is not the same as standard cauliflower with a purple head.

Production 

In 2020, global production of cauliflowers (combined for production reports with broccoli) was 25.5 million tonnes, led by China and India which, combined, had 72% of the world total. Secondary producers, having 0.4–1.3 million tonnes annually, were the United States, Spain, Mexico, and Italy.

Nutrition 

Raw cauliflower is 92% water, 5% carbohydrates, 2% protein, and contains negligible fat (see table). A  reference amount of raw cauliflower provides  of food energy, and has a high content (20% or more of the Daily Value, DV) of vitamin C (58% DV) and moderate levels of several B vitamins and vitamin K (13–15% DV; table). Contents of dietary minerals are low (7% DV or less).

Phytochemicals 
Cauliflower contains several non-nutrient phytochemicals common in the cabbage family that are under preliminary research for their potential properties, including isothiocyanates and glucosinolates. Boiling reduces the levels of cauliflower glucosinolates, while other cooking methods, such as steaming, microwaving, and stir frying, have no significant effect on glucosinolate levels.

Cuisine

Cauliflower heads can be roasted, grilled, boiled, fried, steamed, pickled, or eaten raw. When cooking, the outer leaves and thick stalks are typically removed, leaving only the florets (the edible "curd" or "head"). The leaves are also edible but are often discarded.

Cauliflower is a low-calorie, gluten-free alternative to rice and flour. Between 2012 and 2016, cauliflower production in the United States increased by 63%, and cauliflower-based product sales increased by 71% between 2017 and 2018. Cauliflower rice is made by pulsing cauliflower florets and cooking the result in oil. Cauliflower pizza crust is made from cauliflower flour and is popular in pizza restaurants. Mashed cauliflower is a low-carbohydrate alternative to mashed potatoes.

Fractal dimension 

Cauliflower has been noticed by mathematicians for its distinct fractal dimension, calculated to be roughly 2.8.
One of the fractal properties of cauliflower is that every branch, or "module", is similar to the entire cauliflower. Another quality, also present in other plant species, is that the angle between "modules", as they become more distant from the center, is 360 degrees divided by the golden ratio.

See also

References

Further reading

External links 

 PROTAbase on Brassica oleracea (cauliflower and broccoli)
 Orange Cauliflower Development

Brassica oleracea
Crops originating from Asia
Crops originating from Europe
Edible plants
Food plant cultivars
Inflorescence vegetables